Beechmont is a census-designated place and unincorporated community located in Muhlenberg County, Kentucky, United States.

Demographics

References

Census-designated places in Muhlenberg County, Kentucky
Unincorporated communities in Kentucky
Census-designated places in Kentucky